The International Peace Museum (formerly the Dayton International Peace Museum) is a non-profit, primarily volunteer-run peace museum located in downtown Dayton, Ohio, United States. The Museum's mission is to promote, through education and collaboration, a more equitable, civil, and peaceful world. Its programs and exhibits are non-partisan, secular, and feature themes of conflict resolution, equity, social justice, tolerance, and protecting our natural world. It commemorates the 1995 Dayton Agreement. It is the only peace museum in the Western Hemisphere to still have a physical location.

In addition to functioning as a traditional museum, the Peace Museum serves as an activities center for those who seek a community of peace. The Peace Museum features permanent, temporary, and traveling exhibits that highlight the rich history of, and potential for, nonviolent solutions to conflict and sustainability in the natural world.

Located in the Courthouse Plaza Building on Dayton's Courthouse Square, the Peace Museum includes a library, an interactive children's room, a gathering space where visitors can engage in conversation, and holds events such as book discussions and story slams. 

The museum is open from 10 A.M - 5 P.M Friday and Saturday for visitors and Tuesday - Thursday by appointment. The Museum's admission is $5, it is free for members.

History

The Dayton International Peace Museum was founded in 2004 by farmers Ralph and Christine Dull, along with J. Frederick Arment, Lisa Wolters, and Steve Fryburg. Currently, the museum is run by Executive Director Kevin Kelly and Administrative Assistant Arielle Dzaferagic. It was the second peace museum to be created in the United States, with The Peace Museum in Chicago, Illinois, which closed in the late 2000s, being the first. It is the only one in the Western Hemisphere still with a physical location.

In 2005, the Museum moved into Dayton's historic Isaac Pollack House. In 2014, the 1877 structure was refitted with modern technology. The new equipment allowed the Peace Museum to produce multimedia, interactive exhibits, and to broadcast programs and virtual exhibits to multiple rooms.

Ralph and Christine were long-time peace activists and members of the Fellowship of Reconciliation, receiving numerous awards for books published and their work around the local area. Ralph received the 2009 Pioneer of Ohio Award from Green Energy Ohio and the National EPA Award for Environmental Stewardship in 2010.

Since their departure, the museum has maintained a focus on local change, meeting with local leaders and encouraging broader interpretations of peace within the community. In 2017, the Museum participated in the local "Building Peace Through the Arts" initiative alongside the University of Dayton, Dayton Philharmonic, and other local arts institutions. More recently, in response to the 2019 Dayton shooting and rising gun violence in the Dayton area, the museum partnered with the Facing Project to publish a collection of 16 stories detailing the experience of gun-violence survivors. The book, titled "Facing Gun Violence: It’s Always Close to Home for Someone," was released on August 1st, 2020.

In September 2021 the Museum temporarily closed for visitors, opening again in June 2022 in a new facility on Courthouse Square.

Current initiatives

The Museum is an active member of the Peace in Our Cities global initiative, the Austrian Service Abroad program, the Association of Children's Museums, and are on the advisory board of the International Network of Museums of Peace based in Kyoto.

The museum hosts a number of different permanent and temporary exhibits, notably featuring an extensive exhibit on the Dayton Peace Accords, complete with interactive panels and touchscreens. Their exhibit on the peace accords is the most extensive of its kind and was digitized for the 25th anniversary in 2020. It is currently available on the Museum's website.

Outside of their exhibitions, the museum's standing programs include several discussion based events, with "Building Peace" talks given on a variety of topics by guest speakers and a series of community discussions on Martin Luther King Jr.'s writings called MLK Dialogues. Outside of the talks, they also host weekly guided meditation and yoga, an annual summer camp for children, a Youth Advisory Board, and periodic programs on Kingian Nonviolence, mediation, peace literacy education, and compassionate education. The museum has also held larger events for the community, partnering with former NFL player and Dayton native Chris Borland in the wake of the 2019 Dayton shooting for the inaugural Dayton Peace Festival. Held over three days, the event combined music and free yoga sessions with serious discussions on the gun violence and the community. 

Current Museum Director, Kevin Kelly, has also been active within local media, writing guest opinion columns in the Dayton Daily News on racial and social justice. He has most recently written on the legacies of civil rights icons Martin Luther King Jr. and John Lewis in the contexts of the 2021 storming of the United States Capitol and the COVID-19 pandemic. 

They are also the official repository of each fiction and nonfiction book submitted annually to the Dayton Literary Peace Prize. Recent winners of the Richard Holbrooke Award include John Irving, Hala Alyan, and TaNeshi Coates.

Isaac Pollack House

Built in 1877, the Isaac Pollack House has been the home of the Dayton International Peace Museum since 2004. After emigrating to Dayton from Riedseltz, France in 1854, Isaac Pollack went into business with Soloman Ruah, a fellow immigrant, as whisky and wine dealers. Both men grew to be important civic leaders, with Pollack especially recognized for his service as defending Cincinnati during the Civil War.

Following the end of the war, both men started development on identical houses next to each other. Constructed in Renaissance and Baroque styles, no expense was spared for either house. Hand carved stonework and oak floors filled the interior, all capped off with an ornate Mansard roof. After building finished in 1877, the families flipped a coin to decide which house each got, with Pollack ending up with the house at 319 West Third Avenue. Pollack retired and moved out of the house in 1903, passing away soon after in 1908.

After leaving the Pollack family, the house passed through several hands, largely serving as a home and dance studio. In 1954 Montgomery County bought both houses and, while demolishing Ruah's neighboring house, kept the Pollack House standing against pressure to redevelop the area. In 1974, the house was added to the National Register of Historic Places and, three years later in 1977, was bought from the county and was moved to its current location on Monument Avenue.

In 2005, the Isaac Pollack House became the Museum's home until September 2021.

See also
Peace museum
List of peace activists

References 

McCarty, Mary. Give peace a chance. Dayton Daily News.

External links 
 
 Museums for Peace

Museums in Dayton, Ohio
Peace museums in the United States
History museums in Ohio
Museums established in 2004
2004 establishments in Ohio